Mecklenburgische Brauerei Lübz is a brewery in the German city of Lübz. It is best known for the Lübzer brand. With over 160 employees, it is the biggest employer in the city and one of the largest breweries in the region. Holsten Brewery holds a majority stake in the company; Holsten, in turn, is owned by Carlsberg Group.

History 
The Mecklenburgische Brauerei Lübz was founded in the year 1877 by August Krüger. During the following decades, it was operated under a variety of names, such as Bürgerliches Brauhaus GmbH zu Lübz (1905), Vereinsbrauerei Mecklenburger Wirte GmbH zu Lübz (1907), and Vereinsbrauerei Mecklenburger Wirte AG, Lübz (1921). After World War II, the brewery was dismantled, but production was able to resume in 1947. It could not be seized, as the majority stakeholder (55%) was an American citizen, so the operations continued on a fiduciary basis. A new brewery was constructed in 1969, after which it was folded into the Getränkekombinat Schwerin as "VEB Brauerei Lübz. The brewery owned the only beer canning line in East Germany and the beer was exported to West Germany.

After German reunification, the brewery was acquired by the Hamburg-based Holsten Brewery, which invested heavily in modernization. In 2004, Holsten was acquired by Carlsberg Group.

References 

1877 establishments in Germany
Beer brands of Germany
Breweries in Germany
Companies based in Mecklenburg-Western Pomerania
Pages translated from German Wikipedia
Ludwigslust-Parchim